Hurricane Olaf was a Category 2 Pacific hurricane that struck the Baja California Peninsula in September 2021. The fifteenth named storm and sixth hurricane of the 2021 Pacific hurricane season, the cyclone formed from an area of low pressure that developed off the southwestern coast of Mexico on September 5. The disturbance developed within a favorable environment, acquiring more convection and a surface circulation. The area was determined to have developed into Tropical Depression Fifteen-E on September 8. The depression strengthened into a tropical storm and was named Olaf at 15:00 UTC that day. Olaf quickly strengthened as it moved to the north-northwest, and was upgraded to a hurricane 24 hours after being named. Hurricane Olaf continued to intensify and reached peak intensity while its center was just offshore the southwestern coast of Baja California Sur, with maximum sustained winds of 105 mph (155 km/h) and a minimum barometric pressure of 968 millibars (28.76 inHg). Just after reaching peak intensity, the hurricane made landfall near San José del Cabo. Interaction with the mountainous terrain of the Baja California Peninsula caused Olaf to quickly weaken. It was downgraded to a tropical storm at 15:00 UTC on September 10. The system became devoid of convection that day and degenerated to a remnant low at 09:00 UTC on September 11.

The precursor disturbance to Olaf caused flooding in the southwestern Mexican states of Jalisco and Colima. The storm triggered school, port, and COVID-19 vaccination-site closures in Baja California Sur as it approached the peninsula. Severe rainfall, flooding, mudslides, and minor damage to power lines and hotels have all been reported since Olaf's landfall.

Meteorological history

On September 3 at 00:00 UTC, the National Hurricane Center (NHC) noted the potential for an area of low pressure to develop off of the southwest coast of Mexico. The area eventually developed as predicted around 18:00 UTC on September 5. Over the next few days, conditions progressively got more conductive as the disturbance better organized, producing a large area of gradually organizing thunderstorms while it progressively became better defined. The disturbance then moved north-northwest and acquired a low-level circulation, prompting its designation as a tropical depression at 00:00 UTC on September 8. The depression's inner-core convection was disheveled after formation, but the cyclone organized and became better defined throughout the day. At 15:00 UTC on the same day, the cyclone was upgraded to a tropical storm and was given the name Olaf.  Moving northwestward at a slow pace, Olaf developed banding features and good outflow within very favorable environmental conditions for intensification, featuring warm sea-surface temperatures (SSTs) and low amounts of vertical wind shear. On September 9, the storm developed a well-defined eye and became a Category 1 hurricane around 15:00 UTC.

Olaf intensified at an even quicker rate as it neared to southwestern coast of the Baja California Peninsula, developing a symmetrical eyewall as its winds increased by 20 mph in just six hours. Twenty minutes later, the storm made landfall very near San José del Cabo. Olaf's center briefly crossed the peninsula before re-emerging back over water, weakening back to Category 1 status in the process. Shortly after emerging back over water, the organization of Olaf collapsed, including its eye and eyewall, and it was downgraded to a tropical storm at 15:00 UTC on September 10. Gradually moving westward away from land, Olaf continued to rapidly weaken, with its low-level center becoming exposed and devoid of any deep convection by 21:00 UTC. By 09:00 UTC on September 11, Olaf had been devoid of any organized deep convection for 18 hours, and was therefore designated a remnant low as it turned back to the southwest.

Preparations 

At 03:00 UTC on September 8, tropical storm watches were issued for southern portions of Baja California Sur. These were extended northward at 09:00 UTC before tropical storm warnings were issued for the same areas. These remained until 09:00 UTC on September 9, when hurricane warnings were issued and tropical storm warnings were extended northward. Hurricane and tropical storm warnings were once again extended northward twelve hours later at 21:00 UTC, six hours before landfall. A red alert was issued statewide.

Before landfall, ports and schools were closed and residents living in flood zones were urged to evacuate. COVID-19 vaccinations were suspended and 20,000 tourists fled to hotels. 20 temporary shelters were set up in Baja California Sur for residents with homes in high-risk areas of impact. Classes in Cabo San Lucas were suspended on September 10.

Impact 
Moisture associated with Olaf resulted in heavy rains across Jalisco, which resulted in flooding. This flooding resulted in a collapse of a trailer near Mexican Federal Highway 80, which buried a man. Heavy rains from both Hurricane Nora and Olaf prompted the closure of beaches in Nayarit.

The Federal Electricity Commission (CFE) of Mexico reported that over 191,000 people lost electricity at the height of the storm. By September 12, with the help of 678 electrical workers, 110 cranes, 212 vehicles and 2 helicopters, power had been restored to 94%. Heavy rain, strong winds, and high waves buffeted the southwest coast of the Baja California Peninsula as Olaf hugged it and later made landfall. Hotels received minor damage, and some motorists were trapped in their vehicles. Fallen trees were also reported. Thirty-seven airline flights were cancelled. Damage was estimated at 200 million pesos (US$10 million) in the municipalities of Los Cabos and La Paz.

See also 

Weather of 2021
Tropical cyclones in 2021
List of Category 2 Pacific hurricanes
Other tropical cyclones named Olaf
Hurricane Kiko (1989)
Hurricane Henriette (1995)
Hurricane Odile (2014)

References

External links

 The National Hurricane Center's advisory archive on Hurricane Olaf

	

Category 2 Pacific hurricanes
2021 Pacific hurricane season
Tropical cyclones in 2021
September 2021 events in Mexico
Pacific hurricanes in Mexico
2021 in Mexico